Isewal is a village in Shahkot in Jalandhar district of Punjab State, India. The village is administrated by Sarpanch, an elected representative of the village.

Demography 
, The village has a total number of 99 houses and the population of 500, of which 235 are male while 265 are female.  According to the report published by Census India in 2011, out of the total population of the village 139 people are from Schedule Caste although the village does not have a Schedule Tribe population.

See also
 List of villages in India

References

External links 
 Tourism of Punjab
 Census of Punjab

Villages in Jalandhar district